Betel nut chewing, also called betel quid chewing or areca nut chewing, is a practice in which areca nuts (also called "betel nuts") are chewed together with slaked lime and betel leaves for their stimulant and narcotic effects. The practice is widespread in Southeast Asia, Micronesia, Island Melanesia, and South Asia. It is also found among the indigenous peoples of Taiwan, Madagascar, and parts of southern China. It has also  been introduced to the Caribbean in colonial times.

The preparation combining the areca nut, slaked lime, and betel leaves is known as a betel quid (also called paan or pan in South Asia). It can sometimes include other substances for flavoring and to freshen the breath, like coconut, dates, sugar, menthol, saffron, cloves, aniseed, cardamom, and many others. The areca nut itself can be replaced with or chewed with tobacco, and the betel leaves can be excluded altogether. The preparation is not swallowed, but is spat out afterwards. It results in permanent red stains on the teeth after prolonged use. The spit from chewing betel nuts, which also results in red stains, is also often regarded as unhygienic and an eyesore in public facilities in certain countries.

The practice of betel nut chewing originates from Island Southeast Asia where the plant ingredients are native. The oldest evidence of betel nut chewing is found in a burial pit in the Duyong Cave site of the Philippines (where areca palms were originally native to), dated to around 4,630±250 BP. Its diffusion is closely tied to the Neolithic expansion of the Austronesian peoples. It was spread to the Indo-Pacific during prehistoric times, reaching Micronesia at 3,500 to 3,000 BP, Near Oceania at 3,400 to 3,000 BP; South India and Sri Lanka by 3,500 BP; Mainland Southeast Asia by 3,000 to 2,500 BP; Northern India by 1500 BP; and Madagascar by 600 BP. From India, it was also spread westwards to Persia and the Mediterranean. It was also previously present in the Lapita culture, based on archaeological remains dated from 3,600 to 2,500 BP, but it was not carried into Polynesia.

Betel nut chewing is addictive and has been linked with adverse health effects (mainly oral and esophageal cancers), both with and without tobacco. Attempts to control betel nut chewing by the World Health Organization remains problematic as it is deeply rooted in many cultures, including possessing religious connotations in some parts of Southeast Asia and India. It is estimated that around 600 million people practice betel nut chewing worldwide.

History

Based on archaeological, linguistic, and botanical evidence, the spread of betel chewing is most strongly associated with the Austronesian peoples. Chewing betel requires the combination of areca nut (Areca catechu) and betel leaf (Piper betle). Both plants are native from the region between Island Southeast Asia to Australasia. A. catechu is believed to be originally native to the Philippines, where it has the greatest morphological diversity as well as the most closely related endemic species. The origin of the domestication of Piper betle, however, is unknown, although it is also native to the Philippines, the Lesser Sunda Islands, and Indochina. It is also unknown when the two were combined, as areca nut alone can be chewed for its narcotic properties. In eastern Indonesia, leaves from the wild Piper caducibracteum are also harvested and used in place of betel leaves.

The oldest unequivocal evidence of betel chewing is from the Philippines. Specifically that of several individuals found in a burial pit in the Duyong Cave site of Palawan island dated to around 4,630±250 BP. The dentition of the skeletons is stained, typical of betel chewers. The grave also includes Anadara shells used as containers of lime, one of which still contained lime. Burial sites in Bohol dated to the first millennium CE also show the distinctive reddish stains characteristic of betel chewing. Based on linguistic evidence of how the reconstructed Proto-Austronesian term *buaq originally meaning "fruit" came to refer to "areca nut" in Proto-Malayo-Polynesian, it is believed that betel chewing originally developed somewhere within the Philippines shortly after the beginning of the Austronesian expansion (~5,000 BP). From the Philippines, it spread back to Taiwan, as well as onwards to the rest of Austronesia.

There are very old claims of betel chewing dating to at least 13,000 BP at the Kuk Swamp site in New Guinea, based on probable Areca sp. recovered. However, it is now known that these might have been due to modern contamination of sample materials. Similar claims have also been made at other older sites with Areca sp. remains, but none can be conclusively identified as A. catechu and their association with betel peppers is tenuous or nonexistent.

It reached Micronesia at around 3,500 to 3,000 BP with the Austronesian voyagers, based on both linguistic and archaeological evidence. It was also previously present in the Lapita culture, based on archaeological remains from Mussau dated to around 3,600 to 2,500 BP. But it did not reach Polynesia further east. It is believed that it stopped in the Solomon Islands due to the replacement of betel chewing with the tradition of kava drinking prepared from the related Piper methysticum. It was also diffused into East Africa via the Austronesian settlement of Madagascar and the Comoros by around the 7th century.

The practice also diffused to the cultures the Austronesians had historical contact with. It reached the Dong Son culture via the Austronesian Sa Huỳnh culture of Vietnam at around 3,000 to 2,500 BP through trade contacts with Borneo. It is from this period that skeletons with characteristic red-stained teeth start to appear in Mainland Southeast Asia. It is assumed that it reached South China and Hainan at around the same time, though no archaeological evidence for this can be found as of yet. In Cambodia, the earliest evidence of betel nut chewing is from around 2,400 to 2,200 BP. It also spread to Thailand at 1,500 BP, based on archaeobotanical evidence.

In the Indian subcontinent, betel chewing was introduced through early contact of Austronesian traders from Sumatra, Java, and the Malay Peninsula with the Dravidian-speakers of Sri Lanka and southern India at around 3,500 BP. This also coincides with the introduction of Southeast Asian plants like Santalum album and Cocos nucifera, as well as the adoption of the Austronesian outrigger ship and crab-claw sail technologies by Dravidian-speakers. Unequivocal literary references to betel only start appearing after the Vedic period, in works like Dipavaṃsa (c. 3rd century CE) and Mahāvaṃsa (c. 5th century). Betel chewing only reached northern India and Kashmir after 500 CE through trade with Mon-Khmer-speaking peoples in the Bay of Bengal. From there it followed the Silk Road to Persia and into the Mediterranean.

Chinese records, specifically Linyi Ji by Dongfang Shuo associate the growing of areca palms with the first settlers of the Austronesian Champa polities in southern Vietnam at around 2,100 to 1,900 BP. This association is echoed in Nanfang Cao Mu Zhuang by Ji Han (c. 304 CE) who also describes its importance in Champa culture, specifically in the way Cham hosts traditionally offer it to guests. Betel chewing entered China through trade with Champa, borrowing the Proto-Malayo-Chamic name *pinaŋ resulting in Chinese bin lang for "areca nut", with the meaning of "honored guest", reflecting Chamic traditions. The same for the alternate term bin men yao jian, literally meaning "guest [at the door] medicinal sweetmeat".

Culture

One of the earliest firsthand accounts of betel nut chewing by western authors was from Ibn Battuta. He describes this practice as follows:

Betel quid chewing constitutes an important and popular cultural activity in many Asian and Oceanic countries, including India, Myanmar, Cambodia, the Solomon Islands, Thailand, the Philippines, Laos, and Vietnam.

In urban areas, chewing betel quid is generally considered a nuisance because some chewers spit the betel quid juice out in public areas – compare chewing gum ban in Singapore and smoking ban. The red stain generated by the combination of ingredients when chewed are known to make a colourful stain on the ground. This is becoming an unwanted eyesore in Indian cities such as Mumbai, although many see it as an integral part of Indian culture. This is also common in some of the Persian Gulf countries, such as the UAE and Qatar, where many Indians live. Recently, the Dubai government has banned the import and sale of betel quid and the like.

According to traditional Ayurvedic medicine, chewing betel leaf is a remedy against bad breath (halitosis), but it can possibly lead to oral cancer if taken with tobacco.

Cambodia, Laos and Thailand
The chewing of the product is part of the culture of Cambodia, Laos and Thailand. Cultivation of areca nut palm and betel leaves is common in rural areas of these countries, being a traditional cash crop, and the utensils used for preparation are often treasured. Now, many young people have given up the habit, especially in urban areas, but many, especially older people, still keep to the tradition.

Bangladesh
In Bangladesh, paan is chewed throughout the country by all classes and is an important element of Bangladeshi culture. It is the Bengali ‘chewing gum’, and usually for chewing, a few slices of the betel nut are wrapped in a betel leaf, almost always with sliced areca nuts and often with calcium hydroxide (slaked lime), and may include cinnamon, clove, cardamom, catechu (khoyer), grated coconut and other spices for extra flavouring. As it is chewed,  the peppery taste is savoured, along with the warm feeling and alertness it gives (similar to drinking a fresh cup of coffee). Paan-shupari (shupari being Bengali for areca nut) is a veritable Bangladeshi archetypal imagery, employed in wide-ranging contexts. Prior to British rule, it was chewed without tobacco and it is still rarely chewed with tobacco. Betel leaves are arranged aesthetically on a decorated plate called paandani and it is offered to the elderly people, particularly women, when they engage in leisure time gossip with their friends and relatives. During the zamindari age, paan preparation and the style of garnishing it on a plate (paandani) was indeed a recognised folk art.

In Bangladesh paan is traditionally chewed not only as a habit but also as an item of rituals, etiquette and manners. On formal occasions offering paan symbolized the time for departure. In festivals and dinners, in pujas and punyas paan is an indispensable item. Hindus make use of paans as offerings in worship.

Dhakai Khilipan, a ready pack of betel leaf processed in Dhaka is famous in the sub-continent. Old Dhakaites have a rich heritage of creating the best khili paan with many complex, colourful, aromatic and flavorful ingredients. Although 'paan' has been a staple Bengali custom for ages, a number of high-end stores with premium quality paan has become available in recent times. Paan Supari is perhaps the first such brand, which offers a wide range of khili paan. They also offer a khili paan for diabetic patients called the "paan afsana".

The sweet paan of the Khasi tribe is famous for its special quality. Paan is also used in Hindu puja and wedding festivals and to visit relatives. It has become a ritual, tradition and culture of Bangladeshi society. Adult women gather with paandani along with friends and relatives in leisure time.

Total cultivated area under the crop in Bangladesh is about 14,175 ha and the total annual production is about 72,500 tons. The average yield per acre is 2.27 tons. There are usually three crops during the twelve months and they are locally called by the name of the respective months in which they are harvested. Paan leaf is usually plucked in Kartik, Phalgun and Ashad. The Kartik paan is considered by consumers to be the best and Ashad paan the worst. When plucking, it is a rule to leave at least sixteen leaves on the vine.

Different varieties of betel leaf are grown and the quality differs in shape, bleaching quality, softness, pungency and aroma of leaf. Tamakh paan, a betel leaf blended with tobacco and spices. Supari paan, another variety of white leaf, Mitha paan, a sweet variety, and Sanchi paan are common varieties of betel leaves. Almost every paan-producing district has its own special variety of betel leaf of which consumers are well acquainted. In the past, the best quality of elegant camphor-scented betel leaf named Kafuri paan was produced in the Sonargaon area of Narayangonj district. It was exported to Calcutta and Middle Eastern countries. The next best is the Sanchi paan grown in Chittagong hill tracts. This variety is not very popular among Bangali people. It is exported to Pakistan for the consumers of Karachi. The commoner varieties are called Desi, Bangla, Bhatial, Dhaldoga, Ghas paan. Bangla paan, is also known as Mitha paan, Jhal paan or paan of Rajshahi. At present, this variety is becoming extinct, due to emergence of more profitable and lucrative fast-growing varieties of paan crops. Normally, betel leaves are consumed with chun, seed cinnamon, cardamoms and other flavored elements.

India
In a 16th-century cookbook, Nimatnama-i Nasiruddin-Shahi, describes Ghiyas-ud-din Khalji, the Sultan of Mandu (r. 1469–1500), watches as tender betel leaves of the finest quality are spread out and rosewater is sprinkled on them, while saffron is also added. An elaborate betel chew or paan would contain fragrant spices and rose preserves with chopped areca nuts.

It is a tradition in South India and nearby regions to give two Betel leaves, areca nut (pieces or whole) and Coconut to the guests (both male and female) at any auspicious occasion. Even on a regular day, it is the tradition to give a married woman, who visits the house, two Betel leaves, areca nut and coconut or some fruits along with a string of threaded flowers. This is referred to as thamboolam.

Betel leaf used to make paan is produced in different parts of India. Some states that produce betel leaf for paan include West Bengal, Bihar, Assam, Andhra Pradesh, Uttar Pradesh. In West Bengal, two types of betel leaves are produced. These are "Bangla Pata (Country Leaf)" and Mitha Pata (Sweet Leaf)". In West Bengal, Bangla pata is produced mainly in district of Dinajpur, Malda, Jalpaiguri, and Nadia. Mitha pata is produced in places such as Midnapur and South 24 Parganas.

The skilled paan maker is known as a paanwala in North India. In other parts, paanwalas are also known as panwaris or panwadis. At North India, there is a tradition to chew paan after Deepawali puja for blessings.

In the Indian state of Maharashtra, the paan culture is widely criticised due to the cleanliness problems created by people who spit in public places. In Mumbai, there have been attempts to put pictures of Hindu gods in places where people commonly tend to spit, in the hope that this would discourage spitting, but success has been limited. One of the great Marathi artists P L Deshpande wrote a comic story on the subject of paanwala (paan vendor), and performed a televised reading session on Doordarshan during the 1980s in his unique style.

Paan is losing its appeal to farmers because of falling demand. Consumers prefer chewing tobacco formulations such as gutka over paan. Higher costs, water scarcity and unpredictable weather have made betel gardens less lucrative.

According to StraitsResearch, The India pan masala market is expected to reach US$10,365 million by 2026 at the CAGR of 10.4% during the forecast period 2019–2026. The India pan masala market is driven by significant switching of consumers from tobacco products to pan masala, aggressive advertising and convenient packaging, and Maharashtra State's revocation of the ban over pan masala products.

Assam
In Assam, India, betel nut is traditionally offered as a mark of respect and auspicious beginnings. Paan-tamul (betel leaves and raw areca nut) may be offered to guests after tea or meals, served in a brass plate with stands called bota. The areca nut also appears as a fertility symbol in religious and marriage ceremonies. When showing respect to elders or asking for forgiveness, people, especially newlyweds place a pair of paan-tamul on a xorai, place it in front of the elder and bow to show respect.

Guests may be invited to a wedding reception by offering a few areca nuts with betel leaves. During Bihu, the husori players are offered areca nuts and betel leaves by each household while their blessings are solicited.

Paan-tamul is also offered to guests after the end of every feast, usually the paan-tamul-soon, or slaked lime with cardamom pods in it to freshen the breath.

Banarasi Pan 

Banarasi Pan of Banaras (Varanasi) is widely famous among Indians and tourists visiting India.

Indonesia and Malaysia

Bersirih, nyirih or menginang is a Malayonesian tradition of chewing materials such as nut, betel, gambier, tobacco, clove and limestone. Menginang tradition or chewing betel nut is widespread among Indonesian ethnic groups, especially among the Javanese, Balinese and Malay people; dating back to more than 3000 years. Records of travelers from China showed that betel and areca had been consumed since the 2nd century BCE.

In the Malay archipelago, the menginang or betel nut chewing has become a revered activity in local tradition; being a ceremoniously conducted gesture to honour guests. A complete and elaborate set of sirih pinang equipment is called tepak, puan, pekinangan or cerana. The set is usually made of wooden lacquerware, brass or silverwares; and it consists of the combol (containers), bekas sirih (leaf container), kacip (press-knife to cut areca nut), gobek (small pestle and mortar), and ketur (spit container).

The Sirih Pinang has become a symbol of Malay culture, with the Malay oral tradition having phrases such as "The betel opens the door to the home" or "the betel opens the door to the heart". Menginang is used at many formal occasions such as marriages, births, deaths, and healings. A number of Malay traditional dances—such as the South Sumatran Tanggai dance—are in fact describing the dancers bringing cerana or tepak sirih equipment, ceremoniously presenting an offering of betel nut to the revered guest.

Micronesia
Betel nut chewing is common among the native ethnic groups of Micronesia. They can be grouped into two different traditions. The betel nut chewing tradition of the Chamorro people of the Mariana Islands prefer ripe (red) areca nuts. The betel nut chewing tradition of the Chuukese, Palauan, and Yapese people, on the other hand, prefer unripe (green) areca nuts. Betel leaf and lime are included in the quid, and commonly tobacco. Flavoring ingredients like ginger, cardamom, and vodka are also sometimes added.

Areca palms have been grown traditionally in Guam, Palau, and Yap since ancient times. It spread to Chuuk in modern times. Betel nut stains have been found in ancient remains of the Chamorro people, indicating that the practice was carried into Micronesia by their Austronesian ancestors in Island Southeast Asia.

Myanmar

Kwun-ya ( [kóːn.jà]) is the word for betel quid in Myanmar, formerly Burma, where the most common configuration for chewing is a betel vine leaf (Piper betel), areca nut (from Areca catechu), slaked lime (calcium hydroxide) and some aroma, although many betel chewers also use tobacco.

Betel chewing has very long tradition in Burma, having been practised since before the beginning of recorded history. Until the 1960s, both men and women loved it and every household used to have a special lacquerware box for betel quid, called kun-it, which would be offered to any visitor together with cheroots to smoke and green tea to drink. The leaves are kept inside the bottom of the box, which looks like a small hat box, but with a top tray for small tins, silver in well-to-do homes, of various other ingredients such as the betel nuts, slaked lime, cutch, anise seed and a nut cutter. The sweet form (acho) is popular with the young, but grownups tend to prefer it with cardamom, cloves and tobacco. Spittoons, therefore, are still ubiquitous, and signs saying "No betel quid-spitting" are commonplace, as it makes a messy red splodge on floors and walls; many people display betel-stained teeth from the habit. Betel quid stalls and kiosks used to be run mainly by people of Indian origin in towns and cities. Smokers who want to quit would also use betel nut to wean themselves off tobacco.

Taungoo in Lower Burma is where the best areca palms are grown indicated by the popular expression "like a betel lover taken to Taungoo". Other parts of the country contribute to the best betel quid according to another saying "Tada-U for the leaves, Ngamyagyi for the tobacco, Taungoo for the nuts, Sagaing for the slaked lime, Pyay for the cutch". Kun, hsay, lahpet (betel quid, tobacco and pickled tea) are deemed essential items to offer monks and elders particularly in the old days. Young maidens traditionally carry ornamental betel boxes on a stand called kundaung and gilded flowers (pandaung) in a shinbyu (novitiation) procession. Burmese history also mentions an ancient custom of a condemned enemy asking for "a betel quid and a drink of water" before being executed.

An anecdotal government survey indicated that 40% of men and 20% of women in Myanmar chew betel. An aggregate study of cancer registries (2002 to 2007) at the Yangon and Mandalay General Hospitals, the largest hospitals in the country, found that oral cancer was the 6th most common cancer among males, and 10th among females. Of these oral carcinoma patients, 36% were regular betel quid chewers. University of Dental Medicine, Yangon records from 1985 to 1988 showed that 58.6% of oral carcinoma patients were regular betel chewers.

Since the 1990s, betel chewing has been actively discouraged by successive governments, from the State Law and Order Restoration Council (SLORC) onward, on the grounds of health and tidiness. In April 1995, the Yangon City Development Committee banned betel in Yangon (Rangoon), in anticipation of Visit Myanmar Year 1996, a massive effort to promote the country as a tourist destination. Effective 29 July 2007, betel chewing, along with smoking, has been banned from the Shwedagon Pagoda, the country's most important religious site. In 2010, the Ministry of Education's Department of Basic Education and Burma's Anti-Narcotics Task Force collaborated to prohibit betel shops from operating within  of any school.

Nepal
Paan is chewed mainly by Terai people, although migrants in Terai have also taken up chewing paan in recent times. Throughout Terai, paan is as common as anywhere in northern India. There is some local production, generally not commercial, but most leaves are imported from India. Although not as ubiquitous as in the Terai, most residents of Kathmandu occasionally enjoy paan. A sweet version of paan called meetha paan is popular amongst many who do not like the strong taste of plain (sada) paan. Some parents allow their children to consume meetha in special occasion because it is tobacco-free.

Pakistan
The consumption of paan has long been a very popular cultural tradition throughout Pakistan, especially in Muhajir households, where numerous paans were consumed throughout the day. In general, though, paan is an occasional delicacy thoroughly enjoyed by many, and almost exclusively bought from street vendors instead of any preparations at home. Pakistan grows a large variety of betel leaf, specifically in the coastal areas of Sindh, although paan is imported in large quantities from India, Bangladesh, Sri Lanka and, recently, Thailand. The paan business is famously handled and run by muhajir traders, who migrated from western India to Pakistan after the independence in 1947 (also cite pg 60, of Pakistan,  By Samuel Willard Crompton, Charles F. Gritzner).

The culture of chewing paan has also spread in Punjab where a paan shop can be found in almost every street and market. In the famous Anarkali Bazar in Lahore a street called paan gali is dedicated for paan and its ingredients together with other Pakistani products.

The rate of Oral cancer have grown substantially in Pakistan due to chewing of Paan.

Philippines
Betel nut chewing was formerly widespread in the indigenous ethnic groups of the Philippines. The country is where the areca palm (Areca catechu) is originally native to and where the tradition started before being spread via the Austronesian expansion (see history section above). The Philippines also has the highest genetic diversity in Areca catechu populations and is home to several closely related Areca palm species, including a couple of endemic species that are used as (inferior) substitutes for Areca catechu, these are Areca caliso (known as kaliso or sakolon) and Areca ipot (known as ipot or saksik). Several varieties of Areca catechu nuts were also known in the Philippines, distinguished chiefly by the shape of the fruits.

Betel nut chewing was described as being a "universal" practice among older people in the early 1900s. The most common configuration of the quid combines areca nut with slaked lime (usually from crushed sea-shells) and betel leaves. Tobacco may or may not be added. In modern times, it has grown out of favor and has been replaced by cigarettes and chewing gum. The practice only survives among more remote ethnic groups like the Cordillerans of Luzon, and the Lumad and Moro people of Mindanao.

In the native languages of the Philippines, betel nut chewing is known variously as buyo, bunga, hitso, or ngangà in Tagalog, Bikol, and the Visayan languages; dapiau in Ivatan; and bua, mama or maman in Ilocano; luyos in Kapampangan; pasa in Basilan; and lugos in Zamboanga; among other names.

Taiwan
In Taiwan betel quid is sold from roadside kiosks, often by the so-called betelnut beauties — scantily clad girls selling a quid preparation of betel leaf, betel nuts, tobacco and lime. It is a controversial business, with critics questioning entrapment, exploitation, health, class and culture.

Vietnam
In Vietnam, the areca nut and the betel leaf are such important symbols of love and marriage that in Vietnamese the phrase "matters of betel and areca" (chuyện trầu cau) were historically synonymous with marriage. Areca nut chewing starts the talk between the groom's parents and the bride's parents about the young couple's marriage. Therefore, the leaves and juices are used ceremonially in Vietnamese weddings.

Effects on health

The International Agency for Research on Cancer (IARC) and the World Health Organization (WHO) accept the scientific evidence that chewing betel quids and areca nut is carcinogenic to humans. The main carcinogenic factor is believed to be areca nut. A recent study found that areca-nut paan with and without tobacco increased oral cancer risk by 9.9 and 8.4 times, respectively.

In one study (c. 1985), scientists linked malignant tumours to the site of skin or subcutaneous administration of aqueous extracts of paan in mice. In hamsters, forestomach carcinomas occurred after painting the cheek-pouch mucosa with aqueous extracts or implantation of a wax pellet containing powdered paan with tobacco into the cheek pouch; carcinomas occurred in the cheek pouch following implantation of the wax pellets. In human populations, they reported observing elevated frequencies of micronucleated cells in buccal mucosa of people who chew betel quid in the Philippines and India. The scientists also found that the proportion of micronucleated exfoliated cells is related to the site within the oral cavity where the paan is kept habitually and to the number of betel quids chewed per day. In related studies, the scientists reported that oral leukoplakia shows a strong association with habits of paan chewing in India. Some follow-up studies have shown malignant transformation of a proportion of leukoplakias. Oral submucous fibrosis and lichen planus, which are generally accepted to be precancerous conditions, appear to be related to the habit of chewing paan.

In a study conducted in Taiwan, scientists reported the extent of cancer risks of betel quid (paan) chewing beyond oral cancer, even when tobacco was absent. In addition to oral cancer, significant increases were seen among chewers for cancer of the oesophagus, liver, pancreas, larynx, lung, and all cancer. Chewing and smoking, as combined by most betel chewers, interacted synergistically and was responsible for half of all cancer deaths in this group. Chewing betel leaf quid and smoking, the scientists claimed, shortened the life span by nearly six years.

A Lancet Oncology publication claims that paan masala may cause tumours in different parts of the body and not just the oral cavity as previously thought.

In a study conducted in Sri Lanka, scientists found high prevalence of oral potentially malignant disorders in rural Sri Lankan populations. After screening for various causes, the scientists reported paan chewing to be the major risk factor, with or without tobacco.

In October 2009, 30 scientists from 10 countries met at the International Agency for Research on Cancer (IARC), a World Health Organization sponsored group, to reassess the carcinogenicity of various agents including areca nut, a common additive in paan. They reported there is sufficient evidence that paan chewing, even without tobacco, leads to tumours in the oral cavity and oesophagus, and that paan with added tobacco is a carcinogen to the oral cavity, pharynx and oesophagus.

Effects of chewing paan during pregnancy
Scientific teams from Taiwan, Malaysia and Papua New Guinea have reported that women who chew areca nut formulations, such as paan, during pregnancy significantly increase adverse outcomes for the baby. The effects were similar to those reported for women who consume alcohol or tobacco during pregnancy. Lower birth weights, reduced birth length and early term were found to be significantly higher.

See also
 Domesticated plants and animals of Austronesia
 Betel container (Victoria & Albert Museum)
 Betel chewing in Thailand

References

External links

 Nutritional composition of paan
 

Asian culture
Bangladeshi cuisine
Burmese culture
Cambodian culture
Herbal and fungal stimulants
IARC Group 1 carcinogens
Indian culture
Indonesian culture
Laotian culture
Malaysian culture
Muhajir cuisine
Pakistani culture
Philippine culture
Sindhi cuisine
Sri Lankan culture
Thai culture
Uttar Pradeshi cuisine
Vietnamese culture
Articles containing video clips
Desi culture
Masticatories
Palm trees in culture
Cultural history of Thailand